The Tour of Chongming Island International Cycling Race is an annual elite women's road bicycle racing stage race held in Shanghai, China, named after Chongming Island.

The Tour previously consisted of two races: a stage race and a one-day race. Between 2007 and 2009, the one-day race was a time trial; in 2010, the time trial was replaced by a one-day race, referred to as the Tour of Chongming Island World Cup, that was part of the UCI Women's Road World Cup until 2015. Since 2016, the stage race became part of the new UCI Women's World Tour.

Past winners

Stage race

Individual time trial

World Cup

Jerseys 
As of 2014 edition
 denotes the leader of the overall race.
 denotes the leader of the points classification.

References

External links 
 
 (stage race)
 (time trial)
 (World Cup)
 Statistics at the-sports.org
 Tour of Chongming Island at cqranking.com

 
UCI Women's Road World Cup
Cycle races in China
Sports competitions in Shanghai
Recurring sporting events established in 2007
2007 establishments in China
Women's road bicycle races
Spring (season) events in China
UCI Women's World Tour races